Roger Cohen (born 2 August 1955) is a journalist and author. He was a reporter, editor and columnist for The New York Times, and the International Herald Tribune (later re-branded as the International New York Times). He has worked as a foreign correspondent in fifteen countries.

Early life and education
Cohen was born in London to a Jewish family. His father, Sydney Cohen, a doctor, emigrated from South Africa to England in the 1950s. In the late 1960s, Roger studied at Westminster School, one of Britain's top private schools.  He won a scholarship and would have entered College, the scholars' House, but was told that a Jew could not attend College or hold his particular scholarship. (The scholarship initially offered to him was  intended for persons who professed the Christian faith, as he later learned while researching the affair.)  Instead, he was awarded a different scholarship.

In 1973, Cohen travelled with friends throughout the Middle East, including Iran and Afghanistan.  He drove a Volkswagen Kombi named 'Pigpen' after the late keyboard-playing frontman of the Grateful Dead. (In the article cited, Cohen identifies Pigpen as the drummer for the Filmore East 1971 performances.) He studied History and French at Balliol College, Oxford and graduated in 1977. He left that year for Paris to teach English and to write for Paris Metro. He started working for Reuters and the agency transferred him to Brussels.

Cohen's mother, also from South Africa (b. 1929), attempted suicide in London in 1978. She died there in 1999 and was buried in Johannesburg.

Career

In 1983, Cohen joined The Wall Street Journal in Rome to cover the Italian economy. The Journal later transferred him to Beirut. He joined The New York Times in January 1990. In the summer of 1991, he co-authored with Claudio Gatti In the Eye of the Storm: The Life of General H. Norman Schwarzkopf. The authors wrote the book based on information from Norman Schwarzkopf's sister Sally, without Schwarzkopf's help.

Cohen worked for The New York Times as its European economic correspondent, based in Paris, from January 1992 to April 1994. He then became the paper's Balkan bureau chief, based in Zagreb, from April 1994 to June 1995. He covered the Bosnian War and the related Bosnian Genocide. His exposé of a Serb-run Bosnian concentration camp won the Burger Human Rights Award from the Overseas Press Club of America.

He wrote a retrospective book about his Balkan experiences called Hearts Grown Brutal: Sagas of Sarajevo in 1998. It won a Citation for Excellence from the Overseas Press Club in 1999. Cohen wrote in Hearts Grown Brutal that his coverage of the war changed him as a person, and that he considers himself lucky to still be alive. He later called this period the proudest achievement in his entire journalistic career.

He returned to the paper's Paris bureau from June 1995 to August 1998. He served as bureau chief of the Berlin bureau after September 1998. He took over as foreign editor of the paper's American office in the direct aftermath of the September 11 attacks. His unofficial role was made formal on 14 March 2002. In his tenure, he planned and then oversaw the paper's coverage of the War in Afghanistan. During his first visit to India as an editor, he entered the country without obtaining a visa, having assumed that he would not need one. He was then stuck in diplomatic limbo for several hours. He has called this the most embarrassing moment in his career.

In 2004, he began writing a column called 'Globalist', which is published twice a week in The International Herald Tribune. In 2005, Cohen's third book, Soldiers and Slaves: American POWs Trapped by the Nazis' Final Gamble, was published by Alfred A. Knopf. In 2006, he became the first senior editor for The International Herald Tribune.

After columnist Nicholas D. Kristof took a temporary leave in mid-2006, Cohen took over Kristof's position. He has written columns for the Times since then.

Iraq 
Cohen supported the 2003 American-led invasion of Iraq. He criticised the Bush administration's handling of the occupation while still supporting the cause given the brutality of Saddam Hussein's regime. In January 2009, he commented that Saddam's "death-and-genocide machine killed about 400,000 Iraqis and another million or so people in Iran and Kuwait." He wrote that "I still believe Iraq's freedom outweighs its terrible price."

He opposed the 2007 'surge' of troops into Iraq. In June 2007, he advocated pulling out 105,000 soldiers. He argued that "pulling out a lot of troops is the only way to increase pressure on Maliki to make the political compromises – on distribution of oil revenue, the constitution and de-Baathification – that will give Iraq some long-term chance of cohering."

In November 2008, Cohen stated that "gains are real but fragile" in Iraq. He criticised Democratic candidate Barack Obama's calls for a 16-month withdrawal from the country, calling it irresponsible. Cohen wrote that "we're going to have to play buffer against the dominant Shia for several years".

Iran 
Cohen wrote a series of articles for The New York Times in February 2009 about a trip to Iran. In his writings he expressed opposition to military action against Iran and encouraged negotiations between the United States and the Islamic Republic. He also remarked that Iranian Jews were well treated, and said the Jewish community was "living, working and worshiping in relative tranquility." He also described the hospitality that he received in Iran, stating that "I'm a Jew and have seldom been treated with such consistent warmth as in Iran." In his trip, he paid an Iranian agency $150 a day for the services of a translator, who filed a report on Cohen's doings with the Iranian government.

His depiction of Jewish life in Iran sparked criticism from columnists and activists such as Jeffrey Goldberg of The Atlantic Monthly and Rafael Medoff, director of the David S. Wyman Institute for Holocaust Studies. In his Jerusalem Post op-ed, Medoff criticised Cohen for being "misled by the existence of synagogues" and further argued that Iranian Jews "are captives of the regime, and whatever they say is carefully calibrated not to get themselves into trouble." The American Jewish Committee also criticised Cohen's articles. Dr. Eran Lerman, director of the group's Middle East directory, argued that "Cohen's need to argue away an unpleasant reality thus gives rise to systematic denial".

Roger Cohen responded on 2 March, defending his observations and further elaborating that "Iran's Islamic Republic is no Third Reich redux. Nor is it a totalitarian state." He also stated that "life is more difficult for them [the Jews] than for Muslims, but to suggest they [Jews] inhabit a totalitarian hell is self-serving nonsense." He ended with a warning:

On 12 March, Cohen accepted an invitation to meet with selected members of Los Angeles's Iranian Jewish and Baháʼí Faith communities at Sinai Temple, after receiving some of their critical mail about his column. Cohen defended his views and analysis on Iran and Israel to a partly hostile audience. Rabbi David Wolpe of the Sinai Temple criticised Cohen after the event, saying "increasingly I came to believe that Iran was not Cohen's sole concern; he wanted it as a stick with which to beat Israel over Gaza, whose incursion he wrote left him ashamed."

Cohen argued that the results of the June 2009 Iranian presidential election were fabricated, and incumbent President Ahmadinejad "cheated" his way to victory over reformist Mir Hussein Moussavi. He wrote that "President Obama's outreach must now await a decent interval." He also commented, "I've also argued that, although repressive, the Islamic Republic offers significant margins of freedom by regional standards. I erred in underestimating the brutality and cynicism of a regime that understands the uses of ruthlessness." He was later criticised by Flynt Leverett and Hillary Mann Leverett in the New York Review of Books for trumpeting what they said were baseless accusations of electoral fraud and for his general "incompetence and hypocrisy". Cohen replied that the pair were guilty of, amongst other things, "a cavalier disregard for the Islamic Republic's intermittent brutality", were "apologists without a conscience".

Israel
Cohen wrote in January 2009 that the Israel-Palestinian conflict should not be seen by the United States as just another part of the War on Terrorism. He called for the ending of Israeli settlement construction in the West Bank and the ending of the blockade of the Gaza Strip. He also supported the reconciling of Hamas with Fatah after their violent split. In addition, he criticised the Obama administration for its continuance of past United States policies towards Israel.

Cohen opposed Operation Cast Lead, labelling it "wretchedly named – and disastrous". He has accused Israelis of the "slaying of hundreds of Palestinian children" in the campaign. In an 8 March column, Cohen stated that he had "never previously felt so shamed by Israel's actions." However, in one of his articles in The New York Times, Cohen analyses the differences between European and American attitudes toward Israel.  He contrasts a growing antisemitism in Europe with Americans' generalized support for Israel, and attempts to explain why Americans are more supportive of Israel than Europeans are. In closing the article, Cohen said, "on balance, I am pleased to have become a naturalized American."

Pakistan and Afghanistan
On 8 November 2007, Cohen described the then $10 billion given to the Pakistani government and $22 billion given to the Afghan government as "self-defeating". He called Pakistani leader Pervez Musharraf "a dictator with a gentleman's itch". He also stated that "the U.S. must stick with him and maintain aid for now", but it should press Musharraf for more political reforms.

In September 2008, Cohen stated that only the Afghan people themselves can win the war. He wrote:

Rupert Murdoch
On 12 July 2011, shortly after the News of the World scandal broke, Cohen, who once wrote for the Wall Street Journal before it was bought by Rupert Murdoch, published a New York Times op-ed piece called "In Defense of Murdoch". The article lauds Murdoch's "loathing for elites, for cozy establishments and for cartels", and praised Murdoch's "no-holds-barred journalism". Cohen states that the enterprising Murdochs have been "good for newspapers over the past several decades...and... good for free societies and a more open world". Notwithstanding these positives, in said op-ed Cohen still acknowledges that Fox News has "made a significant contribution to the polarization of American politics".

Awards
Cohen has won numerous awards and honours, among them the Peter Weitz Prize for Dispatches from Europe, the Arthur F. Burns Prize, and the Joe Alex Morris lectureship at Harvard University. He received an Overseas Press Club award for his coverage of third world debt in 1987, the Inter-American Press Association "Tom Wallace" Award for feature writing in 1989.

In 2012, Cohen won the Lifetime Achievement award at the 8th annual International Media Awards in London.

Personal life
Cohen was married to the sculptor Frida Baranek and has four children. They are now divorced. The family lived in Brooklyn, New York until 2010, when he moved back to London, where he'd lived in 1980. Before leaving New York in 2010, he was given a farewell party in July by Richard Holbrooke. He wrote a remembrance of Holbrooke five months later after the diplomat's unexpected death.

Cohen says that "journalism is a young person's game." "When the phone goes in the middle of the night and you're 25 and you're asked to go to Beirut, it's the greatest thing. But when that happens at 50, less so."

Published works
 (With Claudio Gatti) In the Eye of the Storm: The Life of General H. Norman Schwarzkopf. New York: Farrar, Straus, Giroux, 1991. 
 Hearts Grown Brutal: Sagas of Sarajevo. New York: Random House, 1998.  
 Soldiers and Slaves: American POWs Trapped by the Nazis' Final Gamble. New York: Knopf, 2005.  
 Danger in the Desert: True Adventures of a Dinosaur Hunter, New York: Sterling, 2008. 
 The Girl from Human Street: Ghosts of Memory in a Jewish Family, New York: Knopf, 2015.

References

External links 

Roger Cohen's New York Times columnist page

Video: A Dialogue with Roger Cohen and the Iranian Jewish Community
Intelligence Squared debate: Roger Cohen arguing for the motion "The US Should Step Back from Its Special Relationship with Israel"

1955 births
Living people
Writers from London
People educated at Westminster School, London
Alumni of Balliol College, Oxford
International Herald Tribune people
British columnists
English Jews
English people of South African descent
Jewish American writers
Writers from New York (state)
American non-fiction writers
American columnists
The New York Times columnists
21st-century American Jews